John Paul Manley  (born January 5, 1950) is a Canadian lawyer, businessman, and politician who served as the eighth deputy prime minister of Canada from 2002 to 2003.  He served as Liberal Member of Parliament for Ottawa South from 1988 to 2004. From January 2010 to October 2018 he was president and CEO of the Business Council of Canada. He is currently the Chairman of the Canadian Imperial Bank of Commerce (CIBC) and serves on the advisory board of the Leaders' Debates Commission.

Background
Manley was born in Ottawa, Ontario, and attended Bell High School. He received a BA from Carleton University in 1971 and an LL.B. from the University of Ottawa in 1976. He also studied at the University of Lausanne.

After law school Manley clerked under Bora Laskin, the Chief Justice of Canada. He was called to the Ontario bar in 1978.

Manley's early career was in tax law at the firm Perley-Robertson Hill & McDougall LLP. 

He is married to Judith Manley with whom he has three children: Rebecca, David and Sarah.

Manley is also an accomplished marathoner.

Cabinet career
He was first elected as an MP in the 1988 election. When the Liberals came to power under Jean Chrétien following the 1993 election he became Minister of Industry. During his time in Industry, Manley was a staunch supporter of Canada-based research and development, and also of increased technology use in public schools. In particular, he felt that the so-called "wired classroom" would help to equalize the gap between urban and smaller, rural schools. These initiatives were partially aimed at combating the "brain drain", and Manley himself stated that "Canada needs to pursue policies that will make it a magnet for brains, attracting them from elsewhere and retaining the ones we have."

Manley also unveiled a multimillion-dollar rescue package for the cash-strapped Ottawa Senators, being a friend of owner Rod Bryden, but later withdrew the aid after critics argued that there were better uses for public funds.

Manley supported Dalton McGuinty's successful bid to lead the Ontario Liberal Party in 1996.

He was shuffled to Minister of Foreign Affairs on the eve of the 2000 election. He was widely applauded for his work in foreign affairs, particularly for helping to ease strained Canada-U.S. relations. He was seen as able to communicate with the U.S. administration, and had a good working relationship with both Colin Powell and Tom Ridge. David Rudd, then director of Toronto's Canadian Institute of Strategic Studies said: "Under Manley, the government of Canada talks to Washington, not at it." In January 2002 he was appointed as Deputy Prime Minister and given special responsibility for security in response to 9/11. For his performance in these roles, he was named Time Magazine's "Canadian newsmaker of the year" in 2001.

In May 2002, Chrétien appointed Manley as Minister of Finance, following the departure of Paul Martin. His 2003 federal budget laid out billions of dollars in new spending, primarily in health-care, child-care, and for First Nations. It also introduced new accountability features to help limit federal waste.

2003 Liberal leadership election

When Jean Chrétien announced his decision to retire, Manley announced his intention to run for the Liberal leadership. His primary competition was Martin, although Industry Minister Allan Rock and Heritage Minister and former Deputy Prime Minister Sheila Copps also ran, while Brian Tobin briefly contemplated running. Manley's polling numbers and fundraising were slightly behind that of Rock's, while well ahead of Copps but far behind Martin.

From the beginning, it was apparent that Martin had a significant head start on his rivals. Martin's record as Minister of Finance was impressive and he also controlled much of the party machinery by 2002. Manley attacked Martin's refusal to disclose his campaign contributors, but failed to make a significant dent in Martin's support. Manley generally polled around 25% during his time in the contest, and he had the support of ministers Jane Stewart and Susan Whelan and backbench MP John H. Bryden. The rest of cabinet and most of caucus said that they would back Martin (with Martin's large lead, even most Chrétien supporters grudgingly voted for Martin), including Rock who dropped out of the race early on. Seeing his inevitable defeat, Manley withdrew from the race on July 22, 2003, and endorsed Martin.

Upon Martin's landslide victory at the leadership convention on November 14, 2003, political commentators wondered whether someone so closely linked to Chrétien would avoid a potentially embarrassing demotion in Martin's new cabinet. That year, Manley had several times expressed his interest in returning to the Foreign Affairs ministry, as it was likely that Martin would appoint his own lieutenant to the Finance portfolio. Though both were ideologically on the right wing of the Liberal party, Manley's attacks on Martin's campaign donations had likely poisoned the relationship between the two men, hurting Manley's chances of remaining a Minister. Indeed, Manley, Stewart, and Whelan were dropped from cabinet, while Bryden's constituency was abolished after Martin was sworn in as Prime Minister.

Martin, who would release the list of his new cabinet in a few days, decided to offer Manley a role as Ambassador to the United States, a patronage posting Manley said he would seriously consider.  In the end, Manley declined the ambassadorial appointment. Frank McKenna, who had also been considered a federal leadership contender, was appointed instead. On November 28, Manley announced his retirement from politics, remaining as a backbencher until the 2004 federal election.

Post-political career
Shortly after Manley announced his retirement from federal politics, Dalton McGuinty, Premier of Ontario and close friend of Manley, appointed him to chair a Royal Commission on the energy system of Ontario in the wake of the eastern North American blackout of 2003.

On May 18, 2004, he joined the law firm McCarthy Tétrault as counsel, working in their Toronto and Ottawa offices. On May 26, 2004, Manley was named to the board of directors of telecommunications firm Nortel Networks. On January 27, 2005, he was elected to the board of directors of the Canadian Imperial Bank of Commerce. He was also co-chair of the Independent Task Force on North America, a project of the U.S. Council on Foreign Relations. In March 2005, the Task Force released a report that advocated a North American union, an economic union between Canada, Mexico and the United States which would resemble the European Union.

In an interview with La Presse published on January 24, 2005, he openly declared his ongoing interest in the Liberal leadership. In what was seen by political followers as an unusually frank admission, Manley said he would be a candidate to replace Paul Martin if he were to step down in the next three to four years and was maintaining a cross-country organizational network for this purpose. Although he denied the existence of a formal pact with former cabinet-mate Martin Cauchon, he indicated that in a later leadership race he would probably throw his support to the younger man. On January 25, 2006, Manley sent a letter to supporters indicating that he was not going to contest the Liberal leadership after the resignation of Paul Martin.

On October 12, 2007, Manley was appointed by Conservative Prime Minister Stephen Harper to head an independent, non-partisan panel reviewing Canada's mission and future role in Afghanistan, a position he had discussed with Liberal leader Stéphane Dion beforehand. Both Dion and Liberal Foreign Affairs critic Bob Rae had encouraging words for the panel.

Manley's panel reported on Canada's Afghanistan mission to Prime Minister Harper on January 28, 2008, in what was known as the Manley report. Harper accepted the findings, which argued for an indefinite extension of the mission beyond February 2009, but also pointed to logistical and equipment shortfalls, communications challenges with telling the mission's story to Canadians, and a coming manpower strength shortage. The report's recommendations were accepted by the house when the Liberals backed them along with the Conservatives.

Manley had been mentioned as a possible contender for the leadership of the Liberal Party after Stéphane Dion's resignation following the 2008 election, but on November 4, 2008, he announced that he would not be a candidate.

In the December 6, 2008, edition of The Globe and Mail, Manley demanded Liberal leader Stéphane Dion step down so the party can find another leader before Christmas and to "rebuild the Liberal Party, rather than leading a coalition with the NDP. He added, "the notion that the public would accept Stéphane Dion as prime minister, after having resoundingly rejected that possibility a few weeks earlier, was delusional at best ... Mr. Dion had seemed to accept responsibility for the defeat (although somewhat reluctantly), and should have left his post immediately." Dion did, in fact, step down as party leader shortly after Manley's letter was published, however this was a result of internal party pressure and the significance of Manley's letter to this end is debatable.

In June 2009, Manley was named the new President and CEO of the Business Council of Canada (BCC), then known as the Canadian Council of Chief Executives, effective January 2010. He stepped down from that position effective October 15, 2018, and was succeeded by Goldy Hyder.

On July 1, 2009, Manley was appointed an Officer of the Order of Canada for his contributions to Canadian politics, notably as a cabinet minister, and as a business and community leader who had played an important role in the promotion of international aid and co-operation.

He is a member of the Trilateral Commission and sits on the Advisory Council of the Canadian Defence and Foreign Affairs Institute. In 2014, he was appointed as chairman of the board of CIBC.

In September 2019, Manley joined law firm, Bennett Jones, as a Senior Business Advisor. As part of the Bennett Jones Governmental Affairs & Public Policy group, he will work with his team to provide integrated policy and legal expertise, and advisory services on both domestic and international issues.

Political ideology

Manley is regarded by some as being from the centre-right of the Liberal party, favouring fiscal conservatism, free trade, and friendly relations with the United States, although his budget included substantial program spending.

In an interview with Christopher Lim, a contributor for the British think-tank The Bruges Group, Manley was critical of then-Prime Minister Justin Trudeau's economic spending priorities, saying ""I see commitments on spending programmes that will not necessarily add to Canada's productivity or support economic growth – so I'm one that's a bit worried about the trajectory that we are on", and was also wary of the calling of the 2021 federal election, saying that "There was a sense that this election was about Mr. Trudeau and it wasn't about the Canadian people".

Manley seems committed to many of the policies implemented under Chrétien, particularly to expanding foreign aid and improving Canada's "knowledge economy".

Manley is known as a republican and an advocate of the abolition of the Canadian monarchy. This point of view created quite a controversy when, in response to a reporter's question, he publicly stated that the monarchy was unnecessary during a 12-day tour of Canada by the Queen. Manley served as the Queen's escort for the trip.

Electoral record

|- style="background:white;"
| style="text-align:right;" colspan="3"|Difference
|align="right"|23,203
|align="right"|43.2
|align="right"|−8.7

|- style="background:white;"
| style="text-align:right;" colspan="3"|Difference
|align="right"|13,908
|align="right"|26.9
|align="right"|−16.3
|- style="background:white;"
| style="text-align:right;" colspan="3"|Rejected Ballots
|align="right"|231
|align="right"|0.4
|align="right"|−0.3
|- style="background:white;"
| style="text-align:right;" colspan="3"|Turnout
|align="right"|52,021
|align="right"|62.0
|align="right"|−10.3
|- style="background:white;"

References

1950 births
Businesspeople from Ottawa
Canadian Anglicans
Canadian corporate directors
Canadian Ministers of Finance
Canadian republicans
Canadian Ministers of Foreign Affairs
Carleton University alumni
Clerks of the Supreme Court of Canada
Deputy Prime Ministers of Canada
Directors of Nortel
Directors of the Canadian Imperial Bank of Commerce
Lawyers in Ontario
Liberal Party of Canada MPs
Living people
Members of the 26th Canadian Ministry
Members of the House of Commons of Canada from Ontario
Members of the King's Privy Council for Canada
Officers of the Order of Canada
Politicians from Ottawa
University of Ottawa alumni
University of Ottawa Faculty of Law alumni